Antonio Martorell Lacave is a Spanish Navy admiral general who currently serves as Admiral Chief of Staff of the Navy since February 2021.

Lacave is a veteran submarine, NATO and admiral general of the Spanish Navy. He was born on August 22, 1960 in Bilbao. His father had served in Navy Corps of Engineers as a captain. He enrolled in Marín’s Naval Academy Pontevedra in 1979 and was commissioned as an officer after he graduated in 1984. He subsequently served on frigates, corvettes and minesweepers. He served as commander of the Minesweeper Miño and the NATO Standing Countermine Measures Group No. 2. He served in the Amphibious Assault Ship Castilla, 2nd Minesweeper Squadron as executive. He has lectured at the Armed Forces Higher School. He also served as chief in Torpedoes Workshop Cartagena Shipyard.

He served in the Directorate General for Defense Policy of European Union as chief executive. He served at NATO Joint General HQ, Naples in the exercise division. After he was promoted to rear admiral was in 2014, he served at the Logistics Division of the Naval Staff Defence HQ as head until April 2015.

He commanded the Naval Action Group 2 for several years before becoming Admiral of Naval Action, and he oversaw  Operation Atalanta and Maritime HQ of Alta as commander. He was promoted to vice admiral in 2020 and became Admiral of the fleet in May 2020. He became Chief of Staff of the Navy in February 2021, succeeding Admiral General Teodoro López Calderón (although Fausto Escrigas Rodríguez had been serving in an acting capacity at the time).

Decorations 

  Commander with Star of the Royal and Military Order of San Hermenegildo
  Grand Cross of the Royal and Military Order of San Hermenegildo
  Grand Cross of Naval Merit
  Cross of Naval Merit
  Cross of Military Merit (White Badge)
  Kuwait Liberation Medal
  Brazilian Naval Medal
  Article 5 Medal for Operation Active Endeavor
  Cross of the Order Police Merit
  Grand Cross of Aeronautical Merit, (white badge).

Badges

  Peace Operations Badge

References 

1960 births
Living people
People from Bilbao
Spanish military personnel
Spanish naval officers
Spanish admirals
Chiefs of Staff of the Navy (Spain)